The 2017 Party of Growth presidential primaries is the selection process by which voters of the Party of Growth were to choose its potential nominee for President of Russia in the 2018 Russian presidential election. Voting for candidates took place via the internet.

History
At the end of July 2017, the Party of Growth decided on the list of participants in the primaries.

On 10 August 2017, the party's press secretary told the media that the results of the primaries will be taken into account at the party congress which will be held to decide the candidate for Party of Growth; however, the winner of the primaries will not guarantee themselves the right to ballot on behalf of the party.

On 26 November 2017, it was announced that the party will nominate Boris Titov, who was not involved in the primaries. According to a person from the party leadership, none of the proposed candidates were able to obtain sufficient support.

Candidates
Four candidates were nominated for the primaries.

References

2018 Russian presidential election
2017 elections in Russia
Primary elections in Russia
Cancelled elections